George Rolla Reiling (August 24, 1910 – August 10, 2000) was an American football coach.  He was the head football coach at McPherson College in McPherson, Kansas, serving for one season, in 1947, and compiling a record of 1–6.

Head coaching record

References

1910 births
2000 deaths
McPherson Bulldogs football coaches
People from White County, Illinois